Rupert Charles William Bullard Onslow, 8th Earl of Onslow (born 16 June 1967), known as Viscount Cranley from 1971 to 2011, is a British noble and hereditary peer.

Biography
The son of Michael Onslow, 7th Earl of Onslow, and Robin, Countess of Onslow, the Earl of Onslow was educated at Eton College, Western Kentucky University and at King's College London where he graduated with a Bachelor of Arts degree in 1990.

Onslow (then Viscount Cranley) married Leigh Jones-Fenleigh (now Countess of Onslow) on 10 September 1999, an alumna of Cheltenham Ladies' College. They have one child, Lady Olympia Patricia May-Rose Onslow (born 7 July 2003).

Onslow became the 8th Earl of Onslow on the death of his father Michael Onslow, 7th Earl of Onslow, in 2011.

Lord Onslow lives at, owns and manages the Clandon Park agricultural estate. In April 2015 Clandon House burned down, and in that year Onslow said that he wanted the building left as a shell and for the insurance money to be spent on Wentworth Woodhouse, which needed assistance. However Marcus Binney of SAVE disagreed, saying "It would be a terrible waste to leave it as a ruin. As for spending the money elsewhere, you'll be very lucky if the Government don't snaffle it to rebuild the Houses of Parliament". By 2017 Onslow was still disputing the National Trust's plans to develop the ruin as a visitor centre, saying that "the trust would be better off spending the insurance money on buying and preserving another endangered property". 

Onslow specialises in insuring fine art; he is the Fine Art Underwriter at The Channel Syndicate in Lloyd's. His leisure activities are riding, photography and shooting.

Titles
 1967–1971 – The Honourable Rupert Onslow
 1971–2011 – Viscount Cranley
 2011–present – The Right Honourable The Earl of Onslow

References

External links

1967 births
Living people
People educated at Eton College
Alumni of King's College London
Western Kentucky University alumni
8
Place of birth missing (living people)